In systems and control theory, the double integrator is a canonical example of a second-order control system. It models the dynamics of a simple mass in one-dimensional space under the effect of a time-varying force input .

Differential equations 
The differential equations which represent a double integrator are:

where both 
Let us now represent this in state space form with the vector 

In this representation, it is clear that the control input  is the second derivative of the output . In the scalar form, the control input is the second derivative of the output .

State space representation 
The normalized state space model of a double integrator takes the form 

According to this model, the input  is the second derivative of the output , hence the name double integrator.

Transfer function representation 
Taking the Laplace transform of the state space input-output equation, we see that the transfer function of the double integrator is given by

References 

Control theory